Lehigh County Prison was a historic county courthouse located at Allentown, Lehigh County, Pennsylvania. It was built in 1869.

It was added to the National Register of Historic Places in 1981 and delisted in 1998, after being demolished.

References

Government buildings on the National Register of Historic Places in Pennsylvania
Government buildings completed in 1869
Buildings and structures in Allentown, Pennsylvania
1869 establishments in Pennsylvania
National Register of Historic Places in Lehigh County, Pennsylvania

Former National Register of Historic Places in Pennsylvania